The 1998 FIVB Volleyball World League was the ninth edition of the annual men's international volleyball tournament, played by 12 countries from 15 May to 19 July 1998. The Final Round was held in Milan, Italy.

Pools composition

Intercontinental round

Pool A

|}

|}

Pool B

|}

|}

Pool C

|}

|}

Playoff round

Pool West
Host:  Alicante, Spain

|}

|}

Pool East
Host:  Belgrade, Yugoslavia

|}

|}

Final round
Venue:  Forum di Assago, Assago, Italy

|}

|}

Final standing

Awards
Best Scorer:  Osvaldo Hernández
Best Spiker:  Osvaldo Hernández
Best Blocker:  Andrea Giani
Best Server:  Roman Yakovlyev

External links
1998 World League Results
Sports123

FIVB Volleyball World League
FIVB World League
1998 in Yugoslav sport
Volleyball
Volleyball
1998